Elgiganten is a consumer electronics retailer operating in Denmark (including Greenland) and Sweden, where its parent Elkjøp operates in Norway and have subsidiaries like Gigantti (Finland), Elko (Iceland) and Elding (Faroe Islands). There are Elgiganten A/S (Denmark) and Elgiganten AB (Sweden) both directly operated under Elkjøp Nordic AS.  

Currently, Peder Stedal is Managing Director of Elgiganten A/S and Niclas Eriksson is Managing Director of Elgiganten AB. In 2009, English actor John Cleese participated in adverts running on Danish, Swedish, Norwegian  and Finnish television to promote the company. On May 16, 2014, it became clear that Dixons Retail, owner of Elgiganten and The Carphone Warehouse, owner of Phone House in Sweden, are merging. The new company is called Dixons Carphone has changed its name to Dixons Carphone since September 2021.

References

External links
 Swedish site
 Danish site
 Norwegian site
 Finnish site

Consumer electronics retailers
Currys plc
Retail companies established in 1993
Retail companies of Denmark
Retail companies of Finland
Retail companies of Norway
Retail companies of Sweden